Henrikas Žustautas (born 13 July 1994) is a Lithuanian sprint canoeist.

In 2015 he won a gold medal in the 2015 European Games for Lithuania in Canoe sprint.

References

External links

1994 births
Lithuanian male canoeists
Living people
Sportspeople from Plungė
European Games medalists in canoeing
European Games gold medalists for Lithuania
Canoeists at the 2015 European Games
Canoeists at the 2016 Summer Olympics
Olympic canoeists of Lithuania
ICF Canoe Sprint World Championships medalists in Canadian
Canoeists at the 2019 European Games